The Schretzmann S.W.1 Pegasus is a Swiss homebuilt single seat sports aircraft first flown in 1972.  Only one was built.

Design and development

The Pegasus was designed and built by Walter Schretzmann, who began its construction in April 1968.  It first flew in November 1972.  It is an all wood aircraft with wooden spars, frames and entirely plywood covered.  All flying surfaces are cantilever structures, the wings low set. The latter have constant chord and carry flaps.  The fin and rudder are swept, with a shallow dorsal fin.

The single seat cockpit is covered with a windscreen and a separate, prominent, single piece blown bubble canopy.  The Pegasus has a fixed tailwheel undercarriage with oleo-pneumatic shock absorbers within faired legs carrying the main wheels within long wheel spats.

For its first flight the Pegasus was powered by an adapted 100 hp (75 kW) Chevrolet Corvair car engine but proved to be underpowered. A 115 hp (86 kW) flat four Lycoming O-235 was substituted in early 1974 with the expectation of flight in mid-1974.

Operational history
It is not known exactly how long the sole Pegasus HB-YAA remained active. It attended a fly-in at Seppe Airport in the Netherlands in June 1989 and moved to Antwerp in Belgium the following November but was reported as stored there in 1995. The airframe still existed, engineless in 2007 but the Pegasus was not on the European registers in 2010.

Specifications

References

1970s Swiss aircraft